Ezzeddine Hadj Sassi (born on 17 December 1962 on the Kerkennah islands) is a retired  Tunisian footballer.

Career 
He played for Océano Club de Kerkennah as right forward, playing his first game for their senior team on 11 October 1981. He was the best player on his team at the beginning of the 1980s, placing eighth on the table of the best players of the Tunisian Ligue Professionnelle 1, the top division of Tunisian football, in 1985–1986. He was the fourth-highest goalscorer that year, with seven goals.

He was the third-highest goalscorer in the Tunisian Ligue Professionnelle 1 in 1986–87, having scored 11 goals. In 1987–1988 he was the best goalscorer of the League II, with 13 goals.

He played one game for Tunisia national football team. His career ended at the end of the 1993–1994 season.

Goals scored

Awards 
Tunisian Ligue Professionnelle 2
 Winner: 1990–1991
 Winner of South Pole: 1984–1985

References 

Tunisian footballers
Living people
1962 births

Association footballers not categorized by position